The Limburgse Handbal Dagen / Limbourg Handball Days is a handball tournament organized since 1988 in Limburg (Netherlands), especially in the cities of Sittard, Geleen and Beek. The tournament lasts for 3 days with teams from Europe, Africa and Asia.

History
It all started in the spring of 1988, the year that HV Sittardia celebrated their forty-year anniversary. They wanted to organise an international tournament in a celebration of this anniversary. The initial periode of the tournament was in September, before the start of the Dutch competition, but it was too short for a proper organisation. That's why the committee decided to organize the tournament in the period between Christmas and New Year. After an interest in a co-organisaters HV Blauw-Wit and V&L, the Limburgse Handbal Dagen were born.

List of winners

Plural winners

Victories per country

Top three places

References

External links 
  Official website

Handball in the Netherlands